Accelerate is the fourth album by the Christian pop group Jump5. It was released on October 7, 2003. It charted at No. 150 on the Billboard 200 and at No. 8 on the Top Christian Albums charts. The album demonstrated the group's shift towards a pop rock sound, and was also the first album on which a member of the group had writing credits. Half of the album was covers, including "Do Ya" by Michelle Tumes, "Way of the World" by Don Philip and "Walking on Sunshine" by Katrina and the Waves. The group's cover of Sister Sledge's "We Are Family" was later used as the theme for the Radio Disney Family Pledge Initiative. The group's cover of "Shining Star" by Earth, Wind & Fire was part of The Lizzie McGuire Movie's soundtrack.

Track listing

DVD release
Start Dancin' with Jump5 was released on DVD on November 18, 2003. The DVD featured the group teaching the choreography for "Spinnin' Around", "All I Can Do", and "Do Ya". It also contained music videos from the group's previous DVD releases, including the music video for "Do Ya".

References

2003 albums
Jump5 albums
Sparrow Records albums